Cars is an animated film series and Disney media franchise set in a world populated by anthropomorphic vehicles created by John Lasseter, Joe Ranft and Jorgen Klubien. The franchise began with the 2006 film, Cars, produced by Pixar and released by Walt Disney Pictures. The film was followed by Cars 2 in 2011. A third film, Cars 3, was released in 2017. The now-defunct Disneytoon Studios produced the two spin-off films Planes (2013) and Planes: Fire & Rescue (2014).

The first two Cars films were directed by Lasseter, then-chief creative officer of Pixar, Walt Disney Animation Studios, and Disneytoon Studios, while Cars 3 was directed by Brian Fee, a storyboard artist on the previous installments. Lasseter served as executive producer of Cars 3 and the Planes films. Together, all three Cars films have accrued over $1.4 billion in box office revenue worldwide while the franchise has amassed over $10 billion in merchandising sales within its first five years.

History
The Cars franchise began with the original 2006 film. At the time, it was Pixar's least well received film by reviewers. 

The short Mater and the Ghostlight was released as an extra on the Cars DVD on November 7, 2006. A series of shorts called Cars Toons were produced and aired on the Disney Channel to keep interest up. The brand had sold nearly $10 billion in merchandise by the time of the release of Cars 2 in 2011.

In 2007, Cars Four Wheels Rally ride opened in Disneyland Paris.

In the summer of 2012, the 12-acre Cars Land theme area opened at Disney California Adventure in Anaheim as the main component of $1-billion park renovation.

A third film, Cars 3, was announced on October 8, 2015, and was released on June 16, 2017.

Film series

Cars (2006)

Cars is the seventh Pixar film. The story is about rookie race car Lightning McQueen (Owen Wilson), who gets lost on the way to California for a tiebreaker race in the Piston Cup, a famous race worldwide, and ends up in a little town called Radiator Springs on Route 66, that had been bypassed and forgotten when Interstate 40 was built. He accidentally wrecks the road and is sentenced to fix it. During his time there, he meets Mater (Larry the Cable Guy), who became his best friend, and Sally (Bonnie Hunt).

After McQueen fixes the road, Doc Hudson (Paul Newman) no longer wants him in town, so he alerts the media about McQueen's presence, but it doesn't take long for Hudson to realize how much McQueen has helped Radiator Springs, so he goes back to being the Hudson Hornet and becomes McQueen's crew chief, while most of the Radiator Springs folks become his pit crew. McQueen is about to win the race, but helps The King (Richard Petty) cross the finish line after Chick Hicks (Michael Keaton) causes him to crash. Chick wins the Piston Cup after being in third on the last lap, but is later booed by everyone as comeuppance, while Lightning receives praise for his sportsmanship.

Despite his loss, McQueen is offered to be the new face and sponsor of Dinoco, but he declines and decides to stay with Rust-eze, his current sponsor. He does, however, arrange for Mater to ride in the Dinoco helicopter just as he promised. The film ends with McQueen setting up his racing headquarters in Radiator Springs, thereby putting it back on the map.

Cars 2 (2011)

Cars 2 is the twelfth Pixar film. The story starts with Lightning McQueen competing in the World Grand Prix, a three-race event taking place in Japan, Italy, and England, with his racing rival being Italian formula car Francesco Bernoulli (John Turturro).

Along the way, Mater is mistaken for an American spy by British spy Finn McMissile (Michael Caine), and falls in love with junior agent Holley Shiftwell (Emily Mortimer). The three uncover a plot to sabotage the Grand Prix, which is seemingly led by Professor Zündapp (Thomas Kretschmann) and a group of lemon cars. When the event reaches its conclusion in England, Mater deduces that Miles Axlerod (Eddie Izzard) is the mastermind behind the plot, as he started the event in the first place and had intended for cars everywhere to run on oil as revenge for the lemons' reputation as "history's biggest loser cars", implying that Axlerod is also a lemon.

With the plot foiled and the villains defeated, Mater is knighted by the Queen of the United Kingdom (Vanessa Redgrave), and a new race is held in Radiator Springs. Mater is invited by McMissile and Shiftwell to go on another mission, but chooses to stay in Radiator Springs. While his weapons get confiscated, he gets to keep the rocket engines he acquired, as the two agents take off in Siddeley (Jason Isaacs), the British spy jet.

Cars 3 (2017)

Cars 3 is the eighteenth Pixar film. The story focuses on Lightning McQueen, who deals with a new generation of race cars taking over the world of racing. Jackson Storm (Armie Hammer) is an arrogant high tech racer who leads the next generation. As everyone begins to ask him if he might retire, McQueen struggles with keeping up with these racers and during the final race of the season, he suffers a violent crash.

Four months later, a recovering McQueen mourns the late Doc Hudson and travels to the new Rust-eze Racing Center, now under the management of Sterling (Nathan Fillion). Sterling assigns Cruz Ramirez (Cristela Alonzo) to train him on the simulator, which McQueen accidentally destroys after losing control. Ramirez's unconventional training methods and lack of racing experience frustrate McQueen, as they race on beaches and a demolition derby. Ramirez reveals that she had always wanted to be a racer but never found the confidence to do so. In Thomasville, they encounter Hudson's old crew chief Smokey (Chris Cooper), who trains McQueen and explains to him that Hudson found happiness in mentoring him. Smokey's training methods inspire Ramirez as well.

At the Florida 500, McQueen begins racing, but remembers Ramirez's racing dreams and has her take his place in the race. Using what she's learned on the road, Ramirez found the confidence to catch up to Storm. She wins the race along with McQueen and begins racing for Dinoco, whose owner, Tex, purchases Rust-eze. Under the merged Dinoco–Rust-eze brand, Cruz becomes a racer, sporting #51, and McQueen decides to continue racing, with a new paint job in memory of Hudson, but trains Cruz first for the season.

Potential fourth film
Regarding a possible Cars 4, Cars 3 producers Kevin Reher and Andrea Warren told Cinema Blend that "If there's a good story to tell I mean our heads kinda break after having gotten this one done, like oh my God, what could you do the further adventures of? But like any sequel, from Toy Story 4 to Incredibles 2, as long as there's a good story to tell, it's worth investing; we do love these characters, we love them as much as the public does." Regarding which character would be the main protagonist in the movie, Reher and Warren stated that "if Cruz is a breakout character, kind of like Mater was", "she [would] be involved in a 4". Owen Wilson stated at a Cars 3 press event that possible stories have been discussed for a Cars 4, though he would personally like for a fourth Cars movie to delve into aspects of the thriller genre, akin to Cars 2. In an interview with Screen Rant, Lea Delaria expressed interest in reprising her role as Miss Fritter while promoting the release of the short movie Miss Fritter's Racing Skoool with the Cars 3 DVD and Blu-ray release.

Television series

Cars Toons

Cars Toons: Mater's Tall Tales (2008–12)
Mater's Tall Tales is a series of short animated films or Cars Toons featuring the characters Mater and Lightning McQueen from the Cars franchise. The first three shorts premiered in 2008 on Toon Disney, Disney Channel, and ABC Family. Not exclusive to television, the episodes have also been released on DVDs/Blu-rays or as a theatrical short. A total of 11 episodes have been released with "Time Travel Mater" (2012) being the most recent.

All shorts in the series follow the same tall-tale formula: Mater tells a story of something he has done in the past. When Lightning questions Mater over whether the events in the story actually occurred (or in some episodes asks him what he did next), Mater always claimed that Lightning was also involved and continues the story including Lightning's sudden participation. The shorts end with Mater leaving the scene, often followed by characters or references to the story that was being told, suggesting that story might be real.

Cars Toons: Tales from Radiator Springs (2013–14)
Tales from Radiator Springs is a series of short animated films or Cars Toons. The first three two-minute episodes - "Hiccups", "Bugged", and "Spinning" - premiered on March 22, 2013, on Disney Channel, and have been available online since March 24, 2013. A fourth short in the series, titled "The Radiator Springs 500 ½", was released in spring 2014 on the digital movie service Disney Movies Anywhere. It premiered August 1, 2014, on Disney Channel. The short has a running time of 6 minutes rather than the usual two-minute running time.

Cars on the Road (2022)

On December 10, 2020, Pixar announced on Disney Investors Day that an animated series starring Lightning McQueen and Mater traveling the country while meeting friends, new and old, was in development. On November 12, 2021, it was announced that the show would be titled Cars on the Road, and that Owen Wilson and Larry the Cable Guy would reprise their respective roles as Lightning McQueen and Mater. It was released on Disney+ on September 8, 2022 as part of Disney+ Day.

Short films

Mater and the Ghostlight (2006)

Mater and the Ghostlight is a 2006 Pixar computer-animated short created for the DVD of Cars, which was released on October 25, 2006, in Australia and the United States on November 7, 2006. The short, set in the Cars world, tells a story of Mater being haunted by a mysterious blue light.

Miss Fritter's Racing Skoool (2017)
Miss Fritter's Racing Skoool is a 2017 Pixar computer-animated short created for the Blu-ray, 4K Ultra HD and DVD of Cars 3, which was released in the United States on November 7, 2017. The short, set in the Cars world, follows the "blindsided testimonials from the Crazy 8's, touting the transformative impact Miss Fritter's Racing School has had in reshaping the direction of their lives".

Pixar Popcorn shorts 
In December 2020, two Cars short films were announced as part of Disney+'s Pixar Popcorn series, which was released on January 22, 2021. As with most of the shorts present in this series, none of the characters have voice roles.

Unparalleled Parking (2021) 
In this short, the cars have a friendly parallel parking competition.

Dancing with the Cars (2021) 
In this short, the residents of Radiator Springs show off their dancing skills at Flo's V8 Café.

Spin-off film series
In 2013 Disneytoon Studios, Pixar's now-defunct sister company, released a spin-off film set in the Cars world titled Planes featuring planes as the main characters. The film was followed by a sequel titled Planes: Fire & Rescue in 2014.

Planes (2013)

Planes is a computer-animated Cars spin-off film produced by Disneytoon Studios. The first film in a planned trilogy where the main characters are planes, the film was released in theaters by Walt Disney Pictures on August 9, 2013. The film was directed by Klay Hall and executive produced by John Lasseter. In the film, Dusty Crophopper, a small-town cropdusting plane, follows his dreams by competing in a world air race despite his fear of heights.

Planes: Fire & Rescue (2014)

A sequel, titled Planes: Fire & Rescue, was theatrically released on July 18, 2014. This film is also produced by Disneytoon Studios. Bobs Gannaway, co-developer of Jake and the Never Land Pirates and Mickey Mouse Clubhouse, and co-director of Mickey Mouse Works and Secret of the Wings, directed the film. Lasseter again served as executive producer. In the film, Dusty is now a world-famous air racer, but learns he will never be able to race again due to an engine problem. After accidentally starting a fire, Dusty decides to become a firefighter and trains at Piston Peak Air Attack.

Spin-off short film

Vitaminamulch: Air Spectacular (2014)
A Planes short film titled Vitaminamulch: Air Spectacular was released on the DVD and Blu-ray of Planes: Fire & Rescue. It was directed by Dan Abraham and executive produced by John Lasseter. In the short film, Dusty Crophopper and Chug need to replace two daredevils in an airshow Leadbottom is hosting. At first unsuccessful, Dusty and Chug accidentally start a series of events that captures the audience's attention, eventually completing the stunt.

Cancelled projects

To Protect and Serve 
A fifth Tales from Radiator Springs short film, titled To Protect and Serve, was announced to be in development for a 2015 release. However, it was never released. 

The short would have been focused on Sheriff as he takes a mandatory vacation and leaves two rookies (voiced by Wendi McLendon-Covey and Aziz Ansari) to take over his duties as police officer. This, however, causes problems in Radiator Springs as the rookies over-do every aspect of their job in an attempt to score commendations, turning the town into a hotbed of taped-off crime scenes. Sheriff soon senses an imbalance and returns home to right the "justice" that has been served.

Untitled Planes sequel and spin-offs 
At the D23 Expo held in July 2017, John Lasseter announced a third film in the Planes series. Tentatively titled Beyond the Sky, the film would have explored the future of aviation in outer space. The film had a release date of April 12, 2019. It was removed from the release schedule in March 2018 and on June 28, shortly after the announcement of Lasseter's departure from Disney, Disneytoon Studios was shut down, ending development on the film.

Prior to its closure, the studio was planning several more spin-offs of the franchise focusing on boats, trains and other vehicles. In November 2022, concept art for one of the proposed films, tentatively titled Metro, was leaked online.

Reception

Box-office performance
Earning over $1.7 billion, Cars, including its Planes spin-off films, is the eleventh-highest grossing animated franchise.

In its opening weekend, the original Cars earned $60,119,509 in 3,985 theaters in the United States, ranking number one at the box office. In the United States, the film held onto the number one spot for two weeks before being surpassed by Click, and then by Superman Returns the following weekend. It went on to gross $461,983,149 worldwide (ranking number six in 2006 films) and $244,082,982 in the United States (the third-highest-grossing film of 2006 in the country, behind Pirates of the Caribbean: Dead Man's Chest and Night at the Museum). It was the highest grossing animated film of 2006 in the United States, but lost to Ice Age: The Meltdown in worldwide totals.

Cars 2 has earned $191,452,396 in the United States and Canada, and $368,400,000 in other territories, for a worldwide total of $559,852,396. Worldwide on its opening weekend, it made $109.0 million, marking the largest opening weekend for a 2011 animated title.

Critical and public response

Awards and nominations

The first Cars film had a highly successful run during the 2006 awards season. Many film critic associations such as the Broadcast Film Critics Association and the National Board of Review named it the best Animated Feature Film of 2006. Cars also received the title of Best Reviewed Animated Feature of 2006 from Rotten Tomatoes. Randy Newman and James Taylor received a Grammy Award for the song "Our Town", which later went on to be nominated for the Academy Award for Best Original Song (an award it lost to "I Need to Wake Up" from An Inconvenient Truth). The film also earned an Oscar nomination for Best Animated Feature, but it lost to Happy Feet. Cars was also selected as the Favorite Family Movie at the 33rd People's Choice Awards. The most prestigious award that Cars received was the inaugural Golden Globe Award for Best Animated Feature Film. Cars also won the highest award for animation in 2006, the Best Animated Feature Annie Award. The film was also nominated for AFI's 10 Top 10 in the "Animation" genre.

Cast and characters

This is a list of characters from the 2006 film Cars, its 2011 and 2017 sequels Cars 2 and Cars 3, its 2013 and 2014 spin-off films Planes and  Planes: Fire & Rescue, its 2006 and 2017 short films Mater and the Ghostlight and Miss Fritter’s Racing Skoool, its 2014 spin-off short film Vitaminamulch: Air Spectacular, and its 2008 and 2022 television series Cars Toons and Cars on the Road.

 Note: A grey cell indicates the character was not in the film.

Crew

Other media

Video games
In May 2007, the Cars video game was announced to be a "Platinum Hit" on the Xbox, "Greatest Hit" on the PlayStation 2 and PlayStation Portable, and Player's Choice on the GameCube. Two sequels were released, Cars Mater-National Championship and Cars Race-O-Rama. A video game based on Cars 2 was developed by Avalanche Software and published by Disney Interactive Studios for the PlayStation 3, Xbox 360, Wii, PC, and Nintendo DS on June 21, 2011. The PlayStation 3 version of the game was reported to be compatible with stereoscopic 3D gameplay. In October 2014, Gameloft released Cars: Fast as Lightning, a customizable, city-building racing game for smartphone platforms. Lightning McQueen appears as a playable character in Lego The Incredibles which was released in June 2018.

Similar films
From the start, at least two inspired or knock off direct to video series appeared, A Cars Life and The Little Cars, that amounted to being mockbusters.

It has also been noted that the plot of Cars bears a striking resemblance to that of Doc Hollywood, the 1991 romantic comedy which stars Michael J. Fox as a hotshot young doctor, who, after causing a traffic accident in a small town, is sentenced to work at the town hospital, falls in love with a local law student and eventually acquires an appreciation for small town values.

The Autobots
The Autobots was released in July 2015 by Chinese companies Bluemtv and G-Point. On January 1, 2017, Disney and Pixar were awarded damages in their lawsuit against the two companies. The Shanghai Pudong New Area People's Court ruled that the Chinese film titled The Autobots was an illegal copy of Cars thus fined the film's producer and distributor the equivalent of US$194,000. In his defense, director Zhuo Jianrong claimed he had never seen Cars.

A Cars Life
A Cars Life was a series animated by the UAV Corporation and distributed by Allumination Filmworks. There were a total of three films issued from 2006 to 2012.

The Little Cars
The Little Cars is a big series animated by the Toyland Video (Vídeo Brinquedo) and distributed by Branscome International. There were a total of eight films issued from 2006 to 2011. Toyland Video considers its "mockbuster" to be following a "Bollywood" approach of borrowing from Hollywood.

Marcus Aurelius Canônico of Folha de S.Paulo described The Little Cars series (Os Carrinhos in Portuguese), a Brazilian computer graphics film series, as a derivative of Cars. Canônico discussed whether lawsuits from Pixar would appear. The Brazilian Ministry of Culture posted Marcus Aurelius Canônico's article on its website.

Merchandising
The Mattel-produced 1/55 scale Toy Cars were some of the most popular toys of the 2006 Summer Season. Dozens of characters are represented, with some having multiple versions available. Several stores had trouble keeping the toys in stock, and some models are still difficult to find because of being shipped in lower numbers than other characters.

Some online Disney enthusiasts are comparing it to the same shortage that Mattel faced with its Toy Story line in 1995. On August 14, 2007, the die-cast Sarge car, made between May and July 2007, was recalled due to "impermissible levels of lead" used in the paint. Another Cars product which followed the Disney-Pixar Cars Die-Cast Line were miniature versions of the characters which were painted in different colors to represent different events called Mini Adventures. Also, Lego has sets for the sequels.

On June 22, 2006, Disney Consumer Products announced that Cars merchandise broke records for retail sales based on a Disney-Pixar product, recording 10-to-1 more volume than Finding Nemo. DCP reports that product expansion will take place in the fall alongside the DVD release of the film. Mattel has announced that Cars toys will continue through 2008 with the release of at least 80 new vehicles.

A 36 car pack called "Motor Speedway of the South" will feature most of the race cars seen during the opening race sequence of the film. (This is also the name for the track race in the film) Estimates from the New York Daily News indicate that sales of Cars merchandise two weeks out from the release of the film amounted to US$600 million. Estimates put out in November by the Walt Disney Company peg total sales for the brand at around $1 billion.

Kelley Blue Book, a resource for appraising values of vehicles, has humorously "appraised" four of the cars, Lightning McQueen, Mater, Sally Carrera, and Doc Hudson according to their make/model and personalities. The United States Department of Transportation has used scenes from the film in a commercial regarding the Click It or Ticket campaign.

In conjunction with the film's release, a chocolate ice cream on a stick resembling a car tire was released in Australia. These ice creams were called "Burnouts". The naming of the particular product sparked controversy as the name "Burnouts" was believed to have encouraged street racing and committing burnouts. These acts are illegal and heavy fines and convictions are issued to those committing these acts in Australia. It is unknown as to whether the products have been discontinued. In Norway, the candy company Nidar produced candy with the characters on the outer packaging and pictures of the characters on the packaging of the assorted candy on the inside. These bags also came with Cars themed tattoos.

In the U.S., an animated Walmart truck can be seen on a Walmart advertisements for Cars. In the Walmart TV commercial Mater was talking to the Walmart truck. In South Africa, Italy, and several other countries where Opel is present (or with Opel models under Chevrolet and Vauxhall brand), GM has a campaign featuring a General Motors Astra, an Opel Meriva, and a General Motors Zafira as characters in the world of Cars, including TV ads made by Pixar, with the Opel models interacting with Lightning McQueen, Mater and Ramone.

The first ad involved the Opels coming to Radiator Springs as tourists. The second involved their failed attempts at auditioning for Mater. In the end the Opels lost the part to the real Mater. In July 2006, greeting card giant Hallmark Cards unveiled its line of 2006 Keepsake Christmas ornaments. Among the collection was an ornament featuring Lightning McQueen and Mater. There is also a Cars children's clothing line, which produces various T-shirts and shorts.

In Japan, Disney Japan and Toyota backed racing team Cars Racing replaced its racing car "Toy Story apr MR-S" and introduced the "Lightning McQueen apr MR-S" for the 2008 Super GT season. The car was based on the Toyota MR-S and the externals of the car were modeled on its of McQueen as much as possible. This include their number change from their original No.101 to McQueen's #95. They won in Race 3 that season.

As of 2011, the Cars franchise has grossed over $10 billion in merchandise sales revenue.

Theme park attractions

Cars Land

Cars Land is a 12-acre land located at Disney California Adventure which contains an entire full-sized recreation of the town of Radiator Springs from the Cars franchise. The land includes restaurants, shops, and three rides: Mater's Junkyard Jamboree, Luigi's Rollickin' Roadsters, and  Radiator Springs Racers, the main "E-Ticket" attraction which is one of the most expensive rides Disney has ever built at a cost of over $200 million. Radiator Springs Racers lets guests race against each other around Ornament Valley while encountering several Cars characters. Cars Land opened on June 15, 2012, with the completion of Disney California Adventure's expansion along with Buena Vista Street.

Luigi's Rollickin' Roadsters opened on March 7, 2016, and replaced Luigi's Flying Tires, an original Cars Land ride which closed in February 2015 after complaints and injuries.

Cars Four Wheels Rally

Cars Four Wheels Rally (French: Cars Quatre Roues Rallye) is an attraction in Toon Studio at Walt Disney Studios Park at Disneyland Paris in 2007. The ride opened one year after Cars showed its first screening on June 9, 2007.  The attraction's setting is car service station in the small town of Radiator Springs located in the desert. The attraction is surrounded by boulders which imitates the rocky formations of the Grand Canyon. The ride system is a highly themed Zamperla Demolition Derby.

Riders begin the attraction by sitting down in one of the generic car-shaped vehicles. The vehicles are located on one of the four spinning plateaus. The attraction's layout is similar to "Francis' Ladybug Boogie" attraction at Disney California Adventure and the "Whirlpool" at Tokyo DisneySea, as the vehicles automatically change from one spinning plateau to the next. The vehicles change plateaus while carrying out the rotation inversion of eight separate vehicles. Cars Race Rally was the first operating Disney ride themed to the Cars franchise.

Lightning McQueen's Racing Academy

Lightning McQueen's Racing Academy is a living character show attraction hosted by Lightning McQueen located in Sunset Boulevard in Disney's Hollywood Studios that opened on March 31, 2019. Lightning McQueen's Racing Academy is the first of many new attractions coming to Hollywood Studios, part of its shift from studio-like attractions to attractions featuring Disney properties such as Star Wars, Pixar, and Marvel.

Much like the existing Monsters, Inc. Laugh Floor in Magic Kingdom's Tomorrowland, Turtle Talk with Crush in several Disney parks (including Epcot), and Stitch Encounter in the non-American Disney parks, Lightning McQueen's Racing Academy lets guests interact with the character. The other attractions have actors voice the characters, which are manipulated via digital puppetry — the manipulation of digital animated figures in real time.

While the other cars of the Cars films — Mater, Sally Carrera, and Cruz Ramirez, for instance — appear on screens during the show, Lightning appears in physical car form.

Notes

References

External links

 

 
Film franchises introduced in 2006
Animated film series
Pixar franchises
Fictional vehicles
Computer-animated films
Comedy film franchises
Children's film series